Walgreens is an American company that operates the second-largest pharmacy store chain in the United States behind CVS Health. It specializes in filling prescriptions, health and wellness products, health information, and photo services. It was founded in Chicago in 1901, and is headquartered in the Chicago suburb of Deerfield, Illinois. On December 31, 2014, Walgreens and Switzerland-based Alliance Boots merged to form a new holding company, Walgreens Boots Alliance. Walgreens became a subsidiary of the new company, which retained its Deerfield headquarters and trades on the Nasdaq under the symbol WBA. The company was found by a federal jury to have "substantially contributed to" the opioid crisis.

History

 
Walgreens began in 1901, with a small food front store on the corner of Bowen and Cottage Grove Avenues in Chicago, owned by Dixon, Illinois native Charles R. Walgreen. By 1913, Walgreens had grown to four stores on Chicago's South Side. It opened its fifth in 1915 and four more in 1916. By 1919, there were 20 stores in the chain. As a result of alcohol prohibition, the 1920s were a successful time for Walgreens. Although alcohol was illegal, prescription whiskey was available and sold by Walgreens. In 1922, the company introduced a malted milkshake, which led to its establishing ice cream manufacturing plants. The next year, Walgreen began opening stores away from residential areas. In the mid-1920s, there were 44 stores with annual sales of $1,200,000 combined. Walgreens had also expanded by then into Minnesota, Missouri, and Wisconsin. By 1930, it had 397 stores with annual sales of US$4,000,000. This expansion partly was attributed to selling prescribed alcohol, mainly whiskey, which Walgreen often stocked under the counter, as accounted in Daniel Okrent's Last Call: The Rise and Fall of Prohibition. The stock market crash in October 1929 and the subsequent Great Depression did not greatly affect the company. By 1934, Walgreens was operating in 30 states with 601 stores. After Charles Walgreen Sr. died in 1939, his son Charles R. Walgreen Jr. took over the chain until his retirement. The Charles R. Walgreen (Jr.) years were relatively prosperous but lacked the massive expansion seen in the early part of the century. In 1946, Walgreens purchased Sanborns, one of the largest pharmacy and department store chains in Mexico, from Frank Sanborn (Walgreens sold Sanborns to Grupo Carso in 1982). Charles "Cork" R. Walgreen III took over after Walgreen Jr.'s retirement in the early 1950s and modernized the company by switching to barcode scanning. The company also created larger-sized Walgreens Superstores and purchased the Globe Discount City chain of big-box stores from United Mercantile, Inc. in the 1960s The Walgreen family was not involved in senior management of the company for a short time following Walgreen III's retirement. In the 1980s Walgreens owned and operated a chain of casual family restaurants/pancake houses called Wag's. Walgreens sold most of these to Marriott Corp. in 1988, and by 1991 the chain was out of business. In 1986, Walgreens acquired the MediMart chain from Stop & Shop. In 1995, Kevin P. Walgreen was made a vice-president and promoted to senior vice president of store operations in 2006.

21st-century

2000s 
On July 12, 2006, David Bernauer stepped down as CEO of Walgreens and was replaced by company president Jeff Rein, who was later named chief executive officer and chairman of the board. That year, Walgreens acquired the Happy Harry's chain in Delaware, Pennsylvania, Maryland, and New Jersey. On October 10, 2008, Rein abruptly quit as CEO and was replaced by Alan G. McNally as chairman and acting CEO. On January 26, 2009, Gregory Wasson was named CEO effective February 1, 2009.

2010s 
In 2010, Walgreens acquired New York City-area chain Duane Reade for $1.075 billion, including debt, and continued to use the Duane Reade name on some stores in the New York City metropolitan area. In March 2011, Walgreens acquired Drugstore.com for $409 million. On June 19, 2012: Walgreens paid $6.7 billion for a 45% interest in Alliance Boots. That year, Walgreens acquired Mid-South drug store chain operating under the USA Drug, Super D Drug, May's Drug, Med-X, and Drug Warehouse banners.

In 2011 Walgreens announced it would end its relationship with Express Scripts, a prescription benefits manager. A coalition of minority groups, led by Al Sharpton's National Action Network, sent letters urging CEO Gregory Wasson to reconsider. Groups sending letters were National Hispanic Christian Leadership Conference, the Congress of Racial Equality, Hispanic Leadership Fund and others. In 2012, Walgreens announced that it would continue to participate in Express Scripts.

On September 10, 2013, Walgreens announced it had acquired Kerr Drug. In August 2014, Walgreens purchased the remaining 55% of Alliance Boots. The combined company became known as the Walgreens Boots Alliance and was headquartered in Chicago. In December of that year, Walgreens purchased the Almus Pharmaceutical generic brand. Also that year, Walgreens acquired Farmacias Benavides. On July 28, 2016, Walgreens announced it would shut down Drugstore.com, as well as Beauty.com, in order to focus on its own Walgreens.com website. On September 19, 2017, the Federal Trade Commission (FTC) approved Walgreen's fourth attempt to purchase Rite Aid, with 1,932 stores for $4.38 billion total.

2020s 
In February 2020, Walgreens announced the appointment of Richard Ashworth as president of the company, but he left within the year. Prior to the appointment, he served as president of operations for Walgreens.

Corporate operations
Walgreens has its corporate headquarters in Deerfield, Illinois. Walgreens has had a technology office located in Chicago since 2010. The location serves as their digital hub.

In November 2010 Walgreens filed a trademark infringement lawsuit against the Wegmans supermarket chain, claiming the "W" in the Wegman's logo is too similar to Walgreens'. The lawsuit was settled in April 2011, with Wegmans agreeing to discontinue use of its "W" logo by June 2012, although the supermarket retained the right to use the "Wegmans" name in script. According to Jo Natale, Wegmans director of media relations, "The cost of making relatively minor changes to a limited number of products was much less than the cost of litigating this case to the end."

In the summer of 2014, a corporate relocation to Switzerland was considered as part of a merger with Alliance Boots, a European drugstore chain. This drew controversy as many consumers felt that it was an attempt at tax inversion. On August 5, 2014, Walgreens announced that it would not be relocating its headquarters.

As of August 31, 2019, the company operated 9,277 stores in the United States.

Store model 

Walgreens stores were once connected to local groceries. In Chicago, their flagship market, they teamed up with either Eagle Food Centers or Dominick's Finer Foods, usually with a "walkthru" to the adjoining store and often sharing personnel. This concept was instated to compete with the popular dual-store format used by the chief competitor Jewel-Osco/Albertsons-Sav-On. They eventually ended the relationship with Eagle and focused primarily on a connection to Dominick's stores. PharmX-Rexall filled the vacated Walgreen locations joined to Eagle stores.

In its 2009 business model, Walgreens are freestanding corner stores, with the entrance on the street with the most traffic flow, figuratively making it a "corner drugstore" similar to how many independent pharmacies evolved. Many stores have a drive-through pharmacy.

Most freestanding stores have a similar look and layout, including a bigger and more spacious layout than certain stores within major cities. Newer buildings have a more modern design to them compared to older stores. Stores within major cities, such as New York and Chicago, could have multiple floors, most notably their flagship stores. Behind the front registers are tobacco products and alcoholic beverages. However, some stores do not sell these products, e.g., New Jersey stores that do not sell alcohol and Massachusetts stores that do not sell tobacco. Stores usually have a beauty counter located near the cosmetics, with busier stores having a beauty consultant. Most stores have a photo department, which is either behind the front register or in a separate part of the store. There are self-serve photo kiosks near the photo department, where customers can print photos and photo products. Most stores have a pharmacy, usually located in the back, where people can drop off and pick up prescriptions as well as purchase certain drugs containing pseudoephedrine.

Lawsuits and criticism against Walgreens

Allegations of discrimination
In March 2008, Walgreens settled a lawsuit with the Equal Employment Opportunity Commission (EEOC) that alleged the company discriminated against African Americans for $24 million. The settlement was split between the 10,000 African-American employees of the company. In the agreement, Walgreens avoided any admission of guilt.

In September 2011, Walgreens settled a lawsuit with the EEOC that claimed that a store improperly terminated a worker with diabetes for eating a package of the store's food while working to stop a hypoglycemia attack.

Drug-fraud

In June 2008, after Walgreens was sued for drug fraud—"switching dosage forms on three medications without doctor approvals in order to boost profits"—Walgreens agreed to stop these actions and pay $35 million to the federal government, 42 states, and the Commonwealth of Puerto Rico," as reported by the Knoxville News Sentinel.

Medicaid
Also in June 2008, Walgreens "agreed to pay $35 million to the U.S. and 42 states and Puerto Rico for overcharging state Medicaid programs by filling prescriptions with more expensive dosage forms of ranitidine, a generic form of Zantac, and fluoxetine, a generic form of Prozac."

In 2009 Walgreens threatened to leave the Medicaid program, the state and federal partnership to provide health insurance coverage to the poor, in Delaware over reimbursement rates. Walgreens was the largest pharmacy chain in the state and the only chain to make such a threat. The state of Delaware and Walgreens reached an agreement on payment rates and the crisis was averted.

In 2010 Walgreens stopped accepting Medicaid in Washington state, leaving its one million Medicaid recipients unable to get their prescriptions filled at these 121 stores.

On April 20, 2012, the U.S. Department of Justice announced that Walgreens agreed to pay $7.9 million in a settlement. The fine related to allegations of violations of the federal Anti-Kickback Statute and the False Claims Act regarding beneficiaries of federal health care programs.

In January 2019, Walgreens Boots Alliance Inc. agreed to pay more than $269 million to settle federal and state lawsuits that accused the corporation of overbilling federal healthcare programs.

Use of proprietary drugs

Walgreens was named in a lawsuit by the United Food and Commercial Workers Unions and Employers Midwest Health Benefits Fund in the Northern District Court of Illinois in January 2012. The suit alleged that Walgreens and Par Pharmaceutical violated the Racketeer Influenced and Corrupt Organizations Act in "at least two widespread schemes to overcharge" for generic drugs.

Distribution of oxycodone
In September 2012, the U.S. Drug Enforcement Administration (DEA) accused Walgreens of endangering public safety and barred the company from shipping oxycodone and other controlled drugs from its Jupiter, Florida, distribution center. The DEA said that Walgreens failed to maintain proper controls to ensure it didn't dispense drugs to addicts and drug dealers. The DEA also said that six of Walgreens' Florida pharmacies ordered in excess of a million oxycodone pills a year. In contrast, in 2011 the average pharmacy in the U.S. ordered 73,000 oxycodone tablets a year according to the DEA. One Walgreens pharmacy located in Fort Myers, Florida, ordered 95,800 pills in 2009, but by 2011, this number had jumped to 2.2 million pills in one year. Another example was a Walgreens pharmacy located in Hudson, Florida, a town of 34,000 people near Clearwater, that purchased 2.2 million pills in 2011, the DEA said. Immediate suspension orders are an action taken when the DEA believes a registrant, such as a pharmacy or a doctor, is "an imminent danger to the public safety." All DEA licensees "have an obligation to ensure that medications are getting into the hands of legitimate patients," said Mark Trouville, former DEA special agent in charge of the Miami Field Division. "When they choose to look the other way, patients suffer and drug dealers prosper."

The Jupiter, Florida, distribution center, which opened in 2001, is one of 12 such distribution centers owned by Walgreens. Since 2009, Walgreens' Jupiter facility has been the largest distributor of oxycodone in the state of Florida, the DEA said. Over the past three years, its market share has increased, and 52 Walgreens are among the top 100 oxycodone purchasers in the state, the DEA said.

In 2013 United States Attorney Wifredo Ferrer said Walgreens committed "an unprecedented number" of recordkeeping and dispensing violations. Walgreens was fined $80 million, the largest fine in the history of the Controlled Substances Act at that time.

In November 2021, a federal jury found that Walgreens, along with CVS and Walmart, "had substantially contributed to" the opioid crisis. The trial lasted six weeks with the jury returning a verdict finding the pharmacies liable. It was the first trial where pharmacy companies defended themselves amidst the opioid epidemic.

In May 2022, Walgreen's agreed to pay a settlement of $683,000,000 to the state of Florida concerning opioid sales. Walgreens did not admit to wrongdoing as part of the settlement.

Pricing and advertising
Wisconsin's Department of Agriculture, Trade and Consumer Protection fined Walgreens over differences between shelf price and scanned price and for signage in 2012. In 2013, Walgreens paid a $29,241 fine.

The New York State Attorney General announced in April 2016 that a settlement was reached in the complaint that Walgreens used misleading advertising and overcharged consumers. Walgreens would pay $500,000 in penalties, fees and costs, and change advertising and other practices.

A judge in Kansas City, Missouri, ordered Walgreens to pay a $309,000 fine for pricing discrepancies in 2015.

Illegal disposal
In December 2012, a judge ordered Walgreens to pay $16.57 million to settle a lawsuit claiming that over 600 stores were illegally dumping hazardous waste and unlawfully disposing of customer records containing confidential medical information.

Selling expired products and over-charging
A Santa Clara County Superior Court judge allowed Walgreens to pay $2.25 million in January 2018 to resolve a consumer protection lawsuit brought by Bay Area prosecutors alleging that the company sold expired baby food, infant formula, and over-the-counter drugs. The suit also alleged that Walgreens violated state law by charging more than the lowest posted or advertised price for items.

Medication denied because of religious beliefs
In June 2018, a staff pharmacist at a Walgreens in Peoria, Arizona, refused to give a woman medication to end her pregnancy. The medication was prescribed by a doctor after tests revealed that the pregnancy would end in a miscarriage. The woman said she was left "in tears and humiliated". Walgreens responded that its policy "allows pharmacists to step away from filling a prescription for which they have a moral objection".

California Governor Gavin Newsom announced that the state would no longer be doing business with Walgreens due to the company's position on abortion pills.

Investor relations
In September 2018, Walgreens agreed to pay $34.5 million to settle a U.S. Securities and Exchange Commission (SEC) investigation on charges of misleading investors on financial targets. The SEC alleged that former CEO Greg Wasson and then-CFO Wade Miquelon acted "negligently" in giving financial estimates.

Over-billing governments
In January 2019, Walgreens paid $269.2 million for two separate counts of defrauding the federal and 39 state governments in over-billing schemes.

Unlicensed pharmacist
In February 2020, Walgreens agreed to pay $7.5 million to settle a consumer protection lawsuit accusing the company of placing people's health at risk by permitting an unlicensed person to work as a pharmacist without an adequate background check. This person had handled over 745,000 prescriptions, which included filling over 100,000 prescriptions for controlled substances. The State of California, Alameda County, and Santa Clara County all took part in the investigation. When it was asked by the California Board of Pharmacy during the investigation, Walgreens was unable to furnish a copy of her employment application. Although there are records that the person had attended classes in a university pharmacy program, there are no records that she had completed her degree requirements that would allow her to take the pharmacist licensing exams.

Wage theft violations
In March 2021, a class action against Walgreens resulted in a settlement of $4.5 million. Walgreens was accused of wage theft and labor law violations of its employees in California between 2010 and 2017, including that Walgreens "rounded down employees' hours on their timecards, required employees to pass through security checks before and after their shift without compensating them for time worked, and failed to pay premium wages to employees who were denied legally required meal breaks."

Dispensing incorrect vaccines to pre-schoolers
In September 2021, a Walgreens pharmacist in Baltimore, Maryland, accidentally gave a 4-year old girl a full adult dosage of the Pfizer–BioNTech COVID-19 vaccine instead of the intended Influenza vaccine. So far, the little girl has not suffered any major side effects. A Walgreens spokesperson said such mistakes are "extremely rare" and that the company's top priority is patient safety.

A few weeks later, a Walgreens pharmacist in Evansville, Indiana, accidentally gave a 4-year old boy, a 5-year old girl, and their parents a full adult dosage each of the Pfizer vaccine instead of intended flu vaccine. Unlike the Maryland girl, both of the Indiana children immediately got sick enough that the parents took them to a pediatric cardiologist for treatment. At the time of the injections, the FDA had not approve the use of the Pfizer vaccine to children below the age of 12. Although Pfizer was in the process of seeking approval for use in children ages five to 11 with the dosage that would be one third that for an adult, Pfizer had not asked permission to vaccinate children age four or younger. Walgreens refused to comment on the case when requested by news media.

Opioid sales in Tennessee 
In August 2022, the state of Tennessee sued Walgreens, alleging that the pharmacy fueled the state's opioid epidemic by failing to maintain effective controls against abuse of the prescription painkiller. The lawsuit claims that Walgreens willfully flooded the market with an oversupply of prescription narcotics in violation of public nuisance and consumer protection laws.

Opioid sales in Ohio 
In August 2022, a federal judge in Cleveland awarded $650 million to Lake County and Trumbull County in a suit that included CVS and Walmart. Lawyers representing the counties said the companies were responsible for $3.3 billion in damages. Two other companies, Rite Aid and Giant Eagle, were also sued by the counties but settled before trial for an undisclosed amount.

Brands

Contributions to popular culture 

Although milkshakes and malted milk had been around for some time before, Walgreens has claimed credit for the popularization of the malted milkshake (or at least its version of the malted milkshake, invented by Ivar "Pop" Coulson in 1922).

See also

 Alliance Boots
 CVS Pharmacy
 Rite Aid
 Walgreen Coast

References

Citations

General sources

External links

 Walgreens Official website
 

1901 establishments in Illinois
American companies established in 1901
Companies based in Deerfield, Illinois
Companies formerly listed on the New York Stock Exchange
Former components of the Dow Jones Industrial Average
Health care companies based in Illinois
Pharmacies of the United States
Retail companies established in 1901
Walgreens Boots Alliance

sah:Walgreens